John Robert Anderson (9 November 1924 – 14 November 1994) was a Scottish footballer who played as a goalkeeper in the Football League.

References

External links

1924 births
1994 deaths
Scottish footballers
People from Prestwick
Association football goalkeepers
Middlesbrough F.C. players
Crystal Palace F.C. players
Bristol Rovers F.C. players
Bristol City F.C. players
English Football League players
Blackhall Colliery Welfare F.C. players
Footballers from South Ayrshire